William Frith (26 June 1856 – 19 November 1949) was an English-born New Zealand first-class cricketer who played fifteen matches for Canterbury, Otago and Wellington between 1877 and 1894.

Frith was principally an accurate left-arm bowler, but he was also a useful middle-order batsman "with a style of his own", and one of the most brilliant fieldsmen in New Zealand. In 1880–81 he took 8 for 18 for Canterbury against Otago. In 1889–90 he took four wickets in each innings and made 46 in Wellington's victory over Auckland when nobody else in the match exceeded 30. He bowled successfully against touring Test teams, taking three wickets cheaply for Canterbury against the 1878 Australians and five wickets for Otago against the 1882 English team.

Frith was born in England in 1856 and was employed as a printer and, for a time, as a professional cricketer. He married Sophia Skeltan in 1878 and the marriage produced seven children, but she divorced him in 1904 on the grounds of "habitual drunkenness and cruelty [and] failure to maintain [her] and her family". His brother, Charlie Frith, also played cricket for Otago and Canterbury.

References

External links
 

1856 births
1949 deaths
Canterbury cricketers
Cricketers from the London Borough of Enfield
English cricketers
English emigrants to New Zealand
New Zealand cricketers
Otago cricketers
Wellington cricketers